Andrei Voican (born 14 January 1991) is a Romanian football forward.

References

External links
 
 

1986 births
Living people
Romanian footballers
Association football forwards
Liga I players
Liga II players
FC Dinamo București players
FC Universitatea Cluj players
FC Petrolul Ploiești players
CS Afumați players
FC Metaloglobus București players